The 1998 Radisson 200 (also referred to as the Colorado 200 on ABC's TV coverage) was the eighth round of the 1998 Indy Racing League. The race was held on August 16, 1998 at the  Pikes Peak International Raceway in Fountain, Colorado.

Report

Qualifying

Two laps qualifying. The worst lap from any of the drivers are unknown.

  Couldn't qualify after his chassis had been damaged in a practice crash. He was allowed to start the race at the back of the field.

Failed to qualify or withdrew
 Stan Wattles for Metro Racing Systems - took part in practice sessions, but withdrew before qualifying.

Race

  On August 21, both Menard drivers were docked 15 points after the rear wing of their cars was declared illegal in a technical inspection. The penalties were appealed on September 9 and, despite a hearing having been scheduled for September 23, the appeal was dismissed in just two days.

Race Statistics
Lead changes: 10 among 6 drivers

Standings after the race

Drivers' Championship standings before the penalties

Drivers' Championship standings after the penalties

 Note: Only the top five positions are included for the standings.

References

External links
IndyCar official website

1998 in IndyCar
1998 in sports in Colorado
August 1998 sports events in the United States